Sarah Emily Miano, b. 1974, is an American author. She is a native of Buffalo, New York.

Aside from several short stories, Miano published her first novel - Encyclopaedia of Snow - in 2003. Influenced by post-modern authors such as Ezra Pound and T. S. Eliot, the book is structured as an encyclopaedia of snow-related topics, which are formed in an intricate way that interconnect and reflect upon each other which, in its intricacy, resembles a snowflake.

Miano is also the author of the book Van Rijn, a portrait of the painter Rembrandt.

References

1974 births
21st-century American novelists
American women novelists
American women short story writers
Living people
Alumni of the University of East Anglia
21st-century American women writers
21st-century American short story writers